The Bandar Tun Hussein Onn MRT station is a Mass Rapid Transit (MRT) station in Bandar Tun Hussein Onn, located in Cheras Selatan commune, Hulu Langat region, Selangor, Malaysia. It serves as one of the stations on the Klang Valley Mass Rapid Transit (KVMRT) Sungai Buloh–Kajang Line. It was opened on 17 July 2017, together with the Phase 2 opening of the MRT line, along the - stretch.

The station is located at the Bandar Tun Hussein Onn interchange of the Cheras–Kajang Expressway.

This MRT station features a car park with 305 parking bays; TnG payment is accepted.

The station lends its name from the housing development of Bandar Tun Hussein Onn, which in turn is named after Malaysia's third prime minister, Tun Hussein Onn (in office 1976-81).

Station Background

Station Layout 
The station has a layout and design similar to that of most other elevated stations on the line (except the terminus and underground stations), with the platform level on the topmost floor, consisting of two sheltered side platforms along a double tracked line and a single concourse housing ticketing facilities between the ground level and the platform level. All levels are linked by lifts, stairways and escalators.

Exits and entrances 
The station has two entrances. The feeder buses operate from the station's feeder bus hub via Entrance B. Entrance B also provides access to the Park & Ride facility.

Bus Services

MRT Feeder Bus Services 
With the opening of the MRT Kajang Line, feeder buses also began operating linking the station with several housing areas and cities around the Kajang area. The feeder buses operate from the station's feeder bus hub accessed via Entrance A of the station.

Other Bus Services
The MRT Bandar Tun Hussein Onn station also provides accessibility for some other bus services.

See also
 Prasarana Malaysia
 Public transport in Kuala Lumpur
 Klang Valley Integrated Transit System
 List of rail transit stations in Klang Valley

Klang Valley Mass Rapid Transit 
 MRT Corp
 Klang Valley Mass Rapid Transit Project
  (MRT1)
   (MRT2)
  (MRT3)

References

External links
 Bandar Tun Hussein Onn MRT Station | mrt.com.my
 Klang Valley Mass Rapid Transit

Rapid transit stations in Selangor
Sungai Buloh-Kajang Line
Railway stations opened in 2017